Iqbal Ashhar  Urdu: اشهر، اقبا Hindi: इक़बाल अशहर (born 26 October 1965) is an Indian Urdu language poet born in Kucha Chelan, Delhi. Iqbal Ashhar is a son of Abdul Lateef and Sakeena Khatoon; his ancestors hailed from Amroha in Western Uttar Pradesh.

Early life and education 
Iqbal Ashhar received his primary education from Shanta Nursery School and secondary education from Ramjas School No.1 (Daryaganj).B.A (Honours) in Urdu from Zakir Husain Delhi College.

Performance 
Iqbal Ashhar began to attend all-India mushairas in 1998, under the patronage of the late Mauj Rampuri. Professor Wasim Barelvi, Doctor Rahat Indori, Anwar Jalalpuri, Meraj Faizabadi and Munawwar Rana were prominent among the poets who encouraged Iqbal Ashhar. He has attended poetic symposiums in the Districts of India and have also traveled  to USA, UK, UAE, Australia, Canada, Singapore, KSA, Kuwait, Qatar, Bahrain, Oman, Pakistan, etc.

Books 
Dhanak Tere Khayal ki (Hindi and Urdu, 2005)
Ratjage (poetry collection, Urdu, 2010),
Ratjage (second edition, 2013)
Ghazal Sarai (poetry selection)
Urdu Hai Mera Naam

References 

1965 births
Urdu-language poets from India
Living people
Poets from Delhi